Madison Historic District may refer to:

in the United States
(by state)
 Madison Station Historic District, Madison, Alabama, listed on the National Register of Historic Places (NRHP) in Madison County, Alabama
 Madison Green Historic District, Madison, Connecticut, listed on the NRHP in New Haven County, Connecticut
 Madison Historic District (Madison, Georgia), NRHP-listed
 Madison Historic District (Madison, Indiana), a National Historic Landmark in Indiana
 Fort Madison Downtown Commercial Historic District, Fort Madison, Iowa, listed on the NRHP in Iowa
 Madison Civic Commercial District, Madison, New Jersey, listed on the NRHP in New Jersey
 Madison County Fairgrounds, Twin Bridges, Montana, listed on the NRHP in Madison County, Montana
 Madison-Putnam-60th Place Historic District, New York, New York, NRHP-listed
 Madison Square-West Main Street Historic District, Rochester, New York, NRHP-listed
 Madison-Stewart Historic District, Cincinnati, Ohio, NRHP-listed
 Madison and Woodburn Historic District, Cincinnati, Ohio, NRHP-listed
 Madison Avenue Historic District, Toledo, Ohio, listed on the NRHP in Lucas County, Ohio
 Madison Historic District (Madison, South Dakota), listed on the NRHP in Lake County, South Dakota
 Madison Ranch, Rapid City, South Dakota, a historic district listed on the NRHP in Pennington County, South Dakota
 Madison Street Historic District (Clarksville, Tennessee), NRHP-listed
 Madison-Monroe Historic District, Memphis, Tennessee, listed on the NRHP in Shelby County, Tennessee
 Madison-Barbour Rural Historic District, Barboursville, Virginia, listed on the NRHP in Orange County, Virginia
 Madison Farm Historic and Archeological District, Elliston, Virginia, listed on the NRHP in Montgomery County, Virginia
 Madison County Courthouse Historic District, Madison, Virginia, listed on the NRHP in Madison County, Virginia
 Madison Street Historic District (Waukesha, Wisconsin), listed on the NRHP in Waukesha County, Wisconsin

See also
Madison Street Historic District (disambiguation)